Jrarat is a village in the Akhuryan Municipality of the Shirak Province of Armenia. The village contains a ruined 6th-century church.

Demographics

References 

Populated places in Shirak Province